The River Allen is a river in the county of Dorset in South West England. It has two main tributaries, the Gussage Stream and the Crichel Stream.

Route
The River Allen starts at Wyke Farm as a winterbourne and flows down to Monkton Up Wimborne and then to a watercress farm, Honeybrook Farm, a mill and on to Canford Bridge in Wimborne Minster where it joins the Stour. The river is known as a classic chalk stream which supports a good fishery for trout and used to support a good salmonid population. Much of the riverbank is privately owned by two estates, including the Shaftesbury Estate at the source.

Watermills
There have been a number of corn mills on the river. Loverley Mill at Crichel survives as a Grade II listed building. Originally there were two waterwheels but they were replaced in the early 20th century by a water turbine driving a pump to supply water to Crichel House. Other mills were Hinton Farm Mill, Stanbridge Mill and Didlington Mill.

Environment

Since 1946, the water from the Allen has been abstracted for domestic and industrial use. The amount of water taken was having a detrimental effect on the river flow whilst at the same time the salmonid population dropped significantly. Studies have been undertaken into a correlation between the two events and resulted in the abstraction rate being reduced by 50%. Over the last twenty years there has been an increase in arable farming (wheat, barley, oats oilseed rape and peas) as well as some watercress farming discharge reaching the river. The Allen is involved in a major restoration project led by Dorset Wildlife Trust with funding from Wessex Water and Dorset Area of Outstanding Natural Beauty.

The Allen had the strongest population of white clawed crayfish in Dorset, and measures such as tree planting and slowing the flow of the river were implemented to help the species. However, an outbreak of Crayfish plague was discovered on the river in 2014, with at least 100 of the native species found dead in the river. The river also has an abundance of macrophytes including the two most abundant taxa: common water-crowfoot (Ranunculus aquatilis) and bur-reeds (Sparganium). As well as an abundance of brown trout the river is home to minnow, dace, grayling, salmon, perch, roach, pike, bullhead and brook lamprey and the critically endangered European eel.

Water quality
The Environment Agency measure water quality of the river systems in England. Each is given an overall ecological status, which may be one of five levels: high, good, moderate, poor and bad. There are several components that are used to determine this, including biological status, which looks at the quantity and varieties of invertebrates, angiosperms and fish. Chemical status, which compares the concentrations of various chemicals against known safe concentrations, is rated good or fail.

Water quality of the River Allen in 2016:

References

Allen
Wimborne Minster
1Allen